Eddie Richards, also known as Evil Eddie Richards and Jolly Roger, is a British DJ. He was one of the first DJs to champion house music back in the mid 1980s and one of the UK's original mix DJs residing at London's Camden Palace. Along with being a House pioneer, Eddie is also considered the "Godfather" of a subgenre of house, known as Tech House.

Biography
Richards was born in Amersham, Buckinghamshire, England. He first came to prominence in the 1980s as a DJ at the Camden Palace in London., whom he credits the late Colin Faver for getting him a residency at the club. He became resident DJ at Clink Street (alongside Mr. C), where he played a major role in introducing house music to the UK, and he has been called Britain's "godfather of house".

From April 1989 to July 1990, Richards ran a local clubnight Outer Limits at the Sanctuary Music Arena in Bletchley, Milton Keynes. In June 1990, he also founded the DJ agency Dy-na-mix.

Later, Richards devoted more time to music production, releasing and licensing tracks with labels in the UK, Europe & US including End Recordings, Hypervinyl, SoCo Audio, Northern Lights, LHB, & own labels Lunar Tunes, Dy-na-mix & Storm.

Besides his long standing residency at Wiggle, a series of London underground parties, he spins regularly at Fabric in London and has been featured in the Fabric Mix CD series.

Eddie Richards and the Rise of Tech House 
The Roots of Tech House at first, can be rooted in the United Kingdom in the early 90's after the explosion of Acid House. Tech House was seen as the alternative to that, as it didn't have the high energy to be played as much at raves, but seemingly didn't reach it's full potential right away. 

Eddie came into the genre and helped it rise by DJ'ing with Mr. C at the Paul Stone and Clink Street RIP parties in 1988, seen as the counterpart to the Shoom events. These were the key to introducing the Acid House culture in London, England. The Clink Street Parties that Eddie and Mr. C threw were what pioneered the Tech House events that soon followed. Eddie became one of 3 residents at the Iconic Wiggle parties in the early 90s, along with the Drop Parties and Heart and Soul/Release events, Tech House shortly thereafter was then incubated. 

After playing at Clink Street and Heaven in London and The Hacienda in Manchester, Richards then went on to headline the legendary Second Summer of Love parties such as Sunrise, Energy and Helter Skelter among many others. Remix and production work led to the release of club classics such as "Acid Man" in 1988, which reached number 23 in the UK singles charts, followed by other popular remixes of Ralphi Rosario, Orbital and The Shamen.

Discography
"Acid Man" (as Jolly Roger) (10 Records, 1989)
"Why Can't We Live Together" (as Jolly Roger) (Desire Records, 1989)
The Dark EP (Visitor / N.E.W.S, 2002)
9660 EP (Household Digital, 2003)
Fabric 16 (DJ Mix) (Fabric London, 2004)
Classics EP (Bla Bla Music, 2010)
"Soul Is Life / Mbaby" (Storm Recordings, 2014)
"Yeyo / Aaaiii" (Storm Recordings, 2014)
"Dream2 / Imove" (Storm Recordings, 2015)
Lost in Time (as a Remix on Lost in Time) (Asia Music, 2017) 
Nocturnal EP (Sweatbox Records, 2019)

References

External links 

British DJs
Living people
Year of birth missing (living people)
People from Amersham
Musicians from London